Kalinka (released on home video and VOD as In Her Name) is a 2016 French-German drama film directed by . The film is based on the true story of the Kalinka Bamberski case which took place in 1982. The film was released on 16 March 2016.

Plot

In the summer of 1982, 14-year-old Kalinka Bamberski died at her stepfather's house in Germany, where she was staying for the holidays of her boarding school. When the case was closed by the German authorities without a real explanation as to how the teenager died, her French biological father, André Bamberski, became certain that her stepfather, a German doctor, was involved in her death. He spent the next 30 years fighting for the truth, pressuring both French and German authorities into investigating further.

Cast 
 Daniel Auteuil as André Bamberski
 Marie-Josée Croze as Dany
 Sebastian Koch as Dieter Krombach
 Christelle Cornil as Cécile
 Lilas-Rose Gilberti as Kalinka (6-year-old)
 Emma Besson as Kalinka (14-year-old)
 Christian Kmiotek as Robert 
 Serge Feuillard as Maître Gibault
 Fred Personne as Bamberski's Father

References

External links 
 

2016 films
2010s French-language films
French drama films
German drama films
French films about revenge
German films about revenge
StudioCanal films
Drama films based on actual events
2016 drama films
2010s French films
2010s German films